Jaume Elías i Casas (6 November 1919 – 18 September 1977) was a Spanish footballer who played for FC Barcelona between 1943 and 1949. During his career he also played for RCD Espanyol from 1940 until 1943.

Career
Elías was born in Barcelona in 1919 and began his career in the youth ranks of CE Europa. In 1940 he signed a contract with RCD Espanyol and won the Spanish Cup in his first season. In the following year RCD Espanyol reached the finals again but this time they were defeated by Valencia CF.
In 1943 he left for FC Barcelona and in his time at Barcelona he played in 123 league matches and anchored a defensive line with teammate José Puig Puig. He left football in 1949 with only 30 years of age.

Honours
RCD Espanyol
Spanish Cup: 1939-40

Barcelona
Spanish League: 1944-45, 1947–48, 1948–49
Latin Cup: 1949
Copa de Oro Argentina: 1944-45
Copa Eva Duarte: 1947-48

External links
 
 Sportec profile

1919 births
1977 deaths
Footballers from Barcelona
Spanish footballers
Association football defenders
La Liga players
RCD Espanyol footballers
FC Barcelona players
Catalonia international footballers